Adélaïde of Paris (Aélis) (c. 850/853 – 10 November 901) was a Frankish queen. She was the second wife of Louis the Stammerer, King of West Francia and mother of Charles the Simple.

Life
Adelaide was daughter of the count palatine Adalard of Paris. She was chosen by Charles the Bald, King of Western Francia, to marry his son and heir, Louis the Stammerer, despite the fact that Louis had secretly married Ansgarde of Burgundy against the wishes of his father. Although Louis and Ansgarde already had two children, Louis and Carloman, Charles prevailed upon Pope John VIII, to dissolve the union. This accomplished, Charles married his son to Adelaide in February 875. However, the marriage was called into question because of the close blood-kinship of the pair. When on 7 September 878 the pope crowned Louis (who had succeeded his father in the previous year), the pope refused to crown Adelaide.

When Louis the Stammerer died in Compiegne on 10 April 879, Adelaide was pregnant, giving birth on 17 September 879, to Charles the Simple. The birth of this child led to a dispute between Adelaide and Ansgarde. Ansgarde and her sons accused Adelaide of adultery; Adelaide in turn disputed the right of Ansgarde's sons to inherit. Eventually, Adelaide succeeded in winning the case; but despite this, Ansgarde's sons Louis and Carloman remained kings until their deaths without heirs in 882 and 884, respectively, with the crown then being contested between Odo, Count of Paris and Charles the Fat.

Charles eventually succeeded to his father's throne in 898; his mother assisted in crowning him.

Death
She died in Laon on 10 November 901 and was buried in the Abbey of Saint-Corneille, Compiègne, Picardy.

References 

850s births
901 deaths
House of Girard
Carolingian dynasty
Frankish queens consort
French queens consort
Aquitainian queens consort
Women from the Carolingian Empire
Queen mothers